PCMC Bhavan is a Pune Metro station in Pimpri-Chinchwad, India and a terminal station of the Purple line. The station was opened on 6 March 2022 as an inauguration of Pune Metro. Currently Purple Line is operational between PCMC Bhavan and Phugewadi.

Station Layout

An extension has been planned which will remove PCMC station's terminal status and extend the line to Nigdi.

References

Pune Metro stations
Railway stations in India opened in 2022